The Oklahoma Railway Company (ORy) operated interurban lines to El Reno, Guthrie, and Norman, and several streetcar lines in Oklahoma City, and the surrounding area from 1904 to 1947. 

Freight traffic was also handled on the interurban lines as well as a few of the streetcar lines.  The railway had a connection with the Fort Smith and Western Railroad at Guthrie and the two companies interchanged freight cars there.

As World War II approached, the company began to shift focus away from interurban/streetcar operation towards buses; as a result, the company began to gradually abandon its rail operations. As part of this action, several line segments were leased, then sold to the Santa Fe and the Rock Island.

References 

Defunct Oklahoma railroads
Interurban railways in Oklahoma